S. D. Murali (19 May 1964 – 8 September 2010) was an Indian actor who appeared in Kannada and Tamil films. He was famous for roles that portrayed him as a perceptive singer or a tragic lover. His son, Atharvaa, debuted as an actor in the 2010 film Baana Kaathadi.

Early life
Murali was born on 19 May 1964 in  Bangalore to a Kannadiga father and Tamil mother. Murali had two siblings; a younger brother S.D.Suresh and a sister Santhi. He lived and studied up to his 5th Standard in Chennai, and from 6th Standard to 10th Standard he studied in Bangalore. When he was 14 years old, he joined as an assistant director to his father, film director and writer S. Siddalingaiah. For some time, he worked as an editing assistant.

Career
Murali started his acting career in 1982 with the Kannada film Geluvina Hejje, directed by director Eranki Sharma. Prema Parva, Bili Gulabi, Ajeya, Prema Gange, Thayikotta Thali, Sambhavami Yuge Yuge, Ajay-Vijay are the Kannada films he did before entering into Tamil film industry. Poovilangu was his first Tamil film. He earned a good name with that film. He then acted in Pagal Nilavu, along with actress Revathi and directed by Mani Ratnam who made his directorial debut in Tamil cinema. Though this film garnered Murali great recognition, he could not sustain his success much longer. His films started failing at the box-office one after another and during that period, he even acted in double hero subjects : Vanna Kanavugal (1987) with Karthik, Thangamani Rangamani (1989) with S. Ve. Shekher and Ninaivu Chinnam (1989) with Prabhu.

In 1990, he starred in Vikraman's Pudhu Vasantham along with Sithara and Anand Babu, where he plays one amongst four friends who find themselves unexpectedly saddled with a young woman. The film was successful and set off a trend of "friendship" based movies and also propelled his career. In 1991, he acted in Idhayam, where he portrayed the soft hero who was incapable of expressing his love due to his inferiority complex. Soon, Murali found himself playing in rural drama films: Chinna Pasanga Naanga (1992), Manikuyil (1993), Manju Virattu (1994), Adharmam (1994), En Aasai Machan (1994) and Poomani (1996).

In 1997, he acted in three films including the romantic-drama Kaalamellam Kadhal Vaazhga and the rural drama Porkkaalam directed by Cheran. The two films received critical acclaim and were blockbusters at the box-office. The next year, he acted in eight films including the long-delayed Veera Thalattu, the romantic-drama films, Kaadhale Nimmadhi, Poonthottam, Unnudan, the village drama films Rathna and En Aasai Rasave. The six films flopped at the box office. Dhinamdhorum was an average grosser while the much-hyped Desiya Geetham, despite positive reviews, bombed at the box office. In 1999, his flop streak continued with Ooty, the fictional biography Iraniyan, based on the life of the freedom fighter Vattakudi Iraniyan and Kanave Kalaiyadhe becoming box office failures.

In 2000, he acted in  Vetri Kodi Kattu alongside Parthiban. The movie was a success at the box-office enabling Cheran to develop his own style of film-making. The film also won critical acclaim as well winning a State Award and a National Award in the process. Followed by drama movies, Kannukku Kannaga and Manu Needhi. In 2001, he appeared in five films. He plays in multi-starrers including Sonnal Thaan Kathala, Aanandham, Samudhiram, Alli Thandha Vaanam and Kadal Pookkal. Murali received the Tamil Nadu State Film Award for Best Actor for this film. In 2002, he acted in drama, Kamarasu, a comedy, Sundhara Travels and family film, Namma Veetu Kalyanam. The next is Kadhaludan (2003), produced by Devayani and directed by her husband Rajakumaran.

In the early 2000s, Murali lost his appeal at the box office and several of his films, where he collaborated with new directors, subsequently became delayed or shelved. This included project such as Pandian's Kalvettu, Olichandran's Oli, Ramanan's Entrum Sugamae, Abhimanyu's Thala, Paattu Chatham Ketkuthamma and Lovers.

In 2006, he starred in the film, Pasa Kiligal alongside Prabhu, written by	M. Karunanidhi. In 2010, he acted as cameo role named Baana Kaathadi, in which his son Atharvaa made his film debut as an actor. Murali was last seen in his 100th movie Kavasam, after which he died at the age of 46 due to cardiac arrest.

Death
Murali died in the early hours of 8 September 2010 from a sudden massive heart attack in Chennai. He was 46.

Filmography

References

External links
 

1964 births
2010 deaths
Male actors from Bangalore
Male actors in Tamil cinema
Tamil Nadu State Film Awards winners
Male actors in Kannada cinema
Indian male film actors
Kannada people
20th-century Indian male actors
21st-century Indian male actors